Stryneelva or Strynselva is a river in the municipality of Stryn in Vestland county, Norway. The river is among the best salmon rivers in Norway.

See also
List of rivers in Norway

References

Rivers of Vestland
Stryn
Rivers of Norway